Saint-Barnabé is a commune in the Côtes-d'Armor department of Brittany in northwestern France.

Population
Inhabitants of Saint-Barnabé are called barnabéens in French.

Map

See also
Communes of the Côtes-d'Armor department

References

External links

Communes of Côtes-d'Armor